Phymasterna lacteoguttata is a species of beetle in the family Cerambycidae. It was described by Laporte de Castelnau in 1840. It is known from Madagascar. It contains the varietas Phymasterna lacteoguttata var. confluens.

References

Tragocephalini
Beetles described in 1840